Harold Sherill Jamison (born November 20, 1976) is an American former professional basketball player. Born in Orangeburg, South Carolina, he is 6'8" and played at power forward.

Basketball career

In college, Jamison played for Clemson University. He started his National Basketball Association career with the Miami Heat in 1999–2000, appearing in 12 games.

His second season was with the Los Angeles Clippers (2001–02) for whom he played 25 games for and averaged 2.2 points and 1.6 rebounds. After which he was traded along with Darius Miles to the Cleveland Cavaliers in exchange for Andre Miller and Bryant Stith, but he was shortly after waived. Jamison's final NBA game was played on April 17, 2002 in a 103 - 107 loss to the Golden State Warriors (the team's final game of the season). In his final game, Jamison recorded 4 points, 5 rebounds and 1 assist.

Jamison also played professionally in Poland, Italy, Puerto Rico, Turkey, Greece, Ukraine, and Lebanon.

References

External links
NBA.com profile
Stats @ BasketballReference
BC Politekhnika-Halychyna

1976 births
Living people
African-American basketball players
American expatriate basketball people in Iran
American expatriate basketball people in Iraq
American expatriate basketball people in Italy
American expatriate basketball people in Lebanon
American expatriate basketball people in Poland
American expatriate basketball people in Turkey
American expatriate basketball people in Ukraine
American men's basketball players
Asseco Gdynia players
Atléticos de San Germán players
Basketball players from South Carolina
BC Politekhnika-Halychyna players
Clemson Tigers men's basketball players
Los Angeles Clippers players
Miami Heat players
People from Orangeburg, South Carolina
Power forwards (basketball)
S.S. Felice Scandone players
Scafati Basket players
Śląsk Wrocław basketball players
Trabzonspor B.K. players
Undrafted National Basketball Association players
21st-century African-American sportspeople
20th-century African-American sportspeople